Rider University is a private university  in Lawrence Township, New Jersey. It consists of four academic units: the Norm Brodsky College of Business, the College of Liberal Arts and Sciences, the College of Education and Human Services, and Westminster College of the Arts (consisting of the School of Fine and Performing Arts and Westminster Choir College).

History

The school was founded as Trenton Business College on October 1, 1865, by Henry Beadman Bryant and Henry D. Stratton, operators of the Bryant and Stratton chain of private business schools. The school was located in Temperance Hall at the corner of South Broad and Front Streets in Trenton, New Jersey. Andrew J Rider was appointed as its first president. President Rider owned 500 acres of cranberry bogs near Hammonton, New Jersey. According to tradition, this is why the school colors are cranberry and white.

The school grew and periodically moved to larger quarters. In 1896 women were admitted. In 1896 the school was renamed Rider Business College. President Rider stepped down the following year.

In 1920 the institution moved to East State Street in Trenton and officially became known as Rider College. In 1922 the New Jersey Board of Education granted Rider College permission to confer the degrees of Bachelor of Accounts and Bachelor of Commercial Science. In 1957 Rider Business College introduced liberal studies leading to a Bachelor of Arts degree.

In 1959 Rider College moved its campus to a 283-acre suburban tract on Route 206 in Lawrence Township, N.J. On November 15, 1961, President Franklin F. Moore (a 1927 alumnus of the college) announced the gradual reorganization of the college into five separate schools, each headed by a dean who would report to the provost. The changes took effect with the 1962–63 academic year. The five schools included a new School of Liberal Arts and Sciences.

Rider College merged with nearby Westminster Choir College (WCC), located in Princeton, New Jersey, in 1991–92. The campus of Westminster became the Princeton campus of Rider College. On April 13, 1994, the college became Rider University. In 2007 President Mordechai Rozanski announced the creation of the School of Fine and Performing Arts to integrate the Lawrenceville and Princeton campuses and expand programming for the arts.

Today, Rider's Lawrenceville campus is home to its College of Business Administration; College of Liberal Arts, Education, and Sciences; College of Continuing Studies, School of Education, and part of the Westminster College of the Arts, which is also located on the Princeton campus. 

In 2005 Rider completed its  Student Recreation Center (SRC), a 186-bed residence hall, and three-story additions to Ziegler and Hill Residence Halls. The SRC contains locker rooms, a  fitness room with cardiovascular and strength training equipment, two group-exercise studios, three multi-purpose courts, a 3-lane elevated track, and a game room. In recent years President Rozanski announced new academic programs and new financial aid resources. 

On March 28, 2017 it was decided by the Board of Trustees that Rider would attempt to sell WCC to a new affiliate partner. A timeline of 12 months was established with hopes that a buyer would be found in the upcoming year.

On July 1, 2019 it was announced that Beijing Kaiwen was withdrawing from the proposed purchase. This was followed by controversial news that Rider would relocate Westminster's programs to the Rider campus in September 2020 and monetize the sale of Westminster's Princeton Campus. At Rider University's commencement exercises on August 29, 2019, Rider's president announced that the sale of the relocation of Westminster and the sale of Westminster's Princeton Campus would directly benefit Rider University's ongoing campus investments.

Presidents
The current president — Dr. Gregory Dell'Omo — became Rider's seventh president on August 1, 2015, following the retirement of Mordechai Rozanski, who served as president since 2003.

Rider has had seven presidents:
Andrew Jackson Rider (1866–1898)
Franklin Benjamin Moore (1898–1934)
Franklin Frazee Moore (1934–1969)
Frank N. Elliott (1969–1990)
J. Barton Luedeke (1990–2003)
Mordechai Rozanski (2003–2015)
Gregory Dell'Omo (2015–present)

Academics
The College of Liberal Arts and Sciences comprises 13 departments, offering a wide array of more than 70 undergraduate majors and minors. The college also offers master's degrees.

The Norm Brodsky College of Business Administration offers programs at both the bachelors and masters levels. The two graduate degrees offered.

The Department of Graduate Education and Human Services offers five master of arts degrees and 25 certification programs. In addition, two educational specialist degrees are offered.

The Department of Communication and Journalism offers one master of arts degree in Business Communication.

Rankings

U.S. News & World Report ranked Rider University tied for 22nd in the Regional Universities North category in 2016. Forbes ranked Rider University 485th on its "America's Top Colleges" list in 2015.

Campus

The  Lawrenceville campus is in a suburban area three miles (5 km) north of Trenton and five miles (8 km) south of Princeton. Facilities are clustered and within easy walking distance of one another on the large park-like campus. There is a man-made lake with a bridge that allows students to cross easily. The Westminster campus is in Princeton, New Jersey. There is a shuttle that provides service between the campuses.

Academic buildings

Birenbaum Fisher Hall (College of Education & Human Services), the Science and Technology Center (Sciences & Mathematics), the Fine Arts Center (Westminster College of the Arts & Communication), Joseph P. Vonna Academic Annex (Learning Resource Center), the Canastra Health & Sports Center, Anne Brossman Sweigart Hall (Norm Brodsky College of Business Administration), Lynch Adler Hall (History & Philosophy) contain the classrooms and laboratories for all curricula. Built in 2011, Lynch Adler hall is a Leadership in Energy and Environmental Design silver certified,  academic building that stands next to Moore Library. A general access lab containing terminals, microcomputers, and laser printers is located in the Fine Arts Center; other computer labs are located in Anne Brossman Sweigart Hall & Biernbaum Fisher Hall. Central VAX systems provide electronic mail, conferencing, and Internet access tools.

The Princeton Community Japanese Language School teaches weekend Japanese classes for Japanese citizen children abroad to the standard of the Ministry of Education, Culture, Sports, Science and Technology (MEXT), and it also has classes for people with Japanese as a second language. Courses are taught at Biernbaum Fisher Hall. The main office of the school is in Princeton although the office used on Sundays is in Biernbaum Fisher Hall.

Residence halls

Rider University currently has 18 residential halls on their Lawrenceville campus. Of those 18, 12 of them are traditional dorms designed for all undergraduate students, including a 150-bed apartment style building that is available to students via a lottery system. Of the 12 standard residence halls only 8 of them have a designated "Learning Community". A learning community means that the building houses a specific group of students. Which is determined by either the student's year or major. The remaining five houses on Rider's Lawrenceville campus are strictly designated to those students who are members of Greek Life. Currently, the University has four sorority houses, one for each sorority; Alpha Xi Delta, Delta Phi Epsilon, Phi Sigma Sigma and Zeta Tau Alpha. The remaining designated Greek building, University House, is split among members of Rider's three Interfraternity Council (IFC) fraternities. Due to the University's current rule with fraternity housing, no single fraternity has their own house. Instead University House houses members of Tau Kappa Epsilon, Theta Chi and Sigma Phi Epsilon.

Libraries

The Franklin Moore Library supports the academic programs with a collection of more than 481,000 volumes, 2,000 periodical titles, 650,000 microforms, 134 online databases, electronic access to 42,000 journals, and an audiovisual collection. Materials are cataloged in Library of Congress classification and are accessible through an online catalog, part of the library's automated catalog/circulation/acquisitions system. Online database searching is available to complement the library's on-campus holdings. Westminster Choir College's Talbott Library has specialized music resources including 75,000 books, music scores and periodicals, a choral music reference collection of more than 80,000 titles and more than 31,000 sound and video recordings

Publications and media
The Shadow Yearbook First published in 1923 two years after the institution officially changed its name to Rider College. The yearbook continues to be published each year by a student staff.
The Rider News The school's student newspaper, founded in 1930, is now published weekly on Wednesdays between September and May.
WRRC-FM 107.7 The Bronc Student-run radio station, founded in 1962.
Venture The literary magazine welcomes submissions from students’ art and literature focusing on any topic
The Rider University Network (R.U.N.) The student organization produces television programs in the campus studio. Programs are broadcast on campus and online.

Student life
Currently on Rider's Lawrenceville Campus, there are twelve social Greek organizations which are members of the Interfraternity Council, the Panhellenic Council or the Intercultural Greek Council. There are two fraternities and four sororities. In addition to these social Greek organizations, there are numerous professional and honorary fraternities. About 10% of the Rider community is involved in fraternity and sorority life.

Fraternities
Lambda Theta Phi ΛΘΦ
Sigma Phi Epsilon ΣΦΕ
Tau Kappa Epsilon TKE
Theta Chi ΘΧ
Phi Beta Sigma ΦΒΣ

Sororities
Phi Sigma Sigma ΦΣΣ
Alpha Xi Delta ΑΞΔ
Delta Phi Epsilon ΔΦΕ
Lambda Theta Alpha ΛΘΑ
Zeta Tau Alpha ΖΤΑ
Alpha Kappa Alpha AKA
Chi Upsilon Sigma ΧΥΣ
Delta Sigma Theta ΔΣθ
Zeta Phi Beta ΖΦΒ

In the Spring, the Greeks hold "Greek Week". During Greek Week, Fraternities and Sororities compete in a variety of events which change from year to year; however, every year there is a philanthropy event. Past events have benefited St. Jude's Juvenile Cancer Center, as well as paralysis research, neurological disorder research, and various other causes.

On March 30, 2007, 18-year-old student Gary DeVercelly died of alcohol poisoning after a night of heavy drinking at a Phi Kappa Tau fraternity house. The incident was tied to a longstanding hazing tradition involving dangerous quantities of alcohol. Two Rider University officials, including the dean of students, and three students were indicted for aggravated hazing; the charges were dismissed for lack of evidence. Settlement of the civil lawsuit resulted in major policy concessions by the university. The incident had a deep impact on Greek life on campus.

Professional, service, and honorary fraternities
Alpha Lambda Delta ΑΛΔ: Freshman Honors
Alpha Phi Omega ΑΦΩ: Community Service Fraternity
Alpha Psi Omega ΑΨΩ: Theater Honors Society
Beta Alpha Psi ΒΑΨ: Accounting, Finance, Information Systems Honors Society
Delta Sigma Pi ΔΣΠ: Professional Business Fraternity
Kappa Delta Pi ΚΔΠ: Education Honors Society
Lambda Pi Eta λΠη: Communications & Journalism Honors Society
Omicron Delta Kappa O∆K: Leadership Honors Society
Phi Alpha Theta ΦΑΘ: History Honors Society
Sigma Tau Delta ΣΤΔ: English Honors Society
Pi Sigma Epsilon ΠΣΕ: Marketing Fraternity 
Phi Sigma Tau : Philosophy Honors Society

Theater

According to the Rider website, Rider University's Westminster College of the Arts has had an extensive theater program with people from all over the country coming for the quality program. For over half a century the Theatre department at Rider University has had a rich tradition in educating students and preparing them for all aspects of a life in theater.

Six productions each year give students a wide variety of experiences and opportunities. They are a combination of musicals and straight plays.

A professionally active faculty whose backgrounds include directing and design experience nationwide; acting on Broadway, with national tours and regional theater companies, on film and screen, as well as commercial and voice-over work.

Professional performing arts facilities include The Yvonne Theater, The Spitz Studio Theater, and Bart Luedeke Arts Center.

Various guest artists have come to Rider to teach Master Classes including Lennie Daniels, Christine Ebersole, Heather Hurst, Adam Jacobs, Derek Klena, Norm Lewis, Kelli O'Hara, Laura Osnes, Rachelle Rak, Andy Richardson, Nikki Snelson, Ben Vereen, Frank Wildhorn, and Mary Zimmerman.

Athletics

Athletic teams are nicknamed the Broncs. The school competes in the NCAA Division I Metro Atlantic Athletic Conference. As the MAAC is a non-wrestling conference, Rider's wrestling team competes as a member of the Mid-American Conference.

The intercollegiate sports program at Rider was started by coach Clair Bee in the 1920s. Two of the school's most famous athletic alumni are former Notre Dame basketball coach and current ESPN sportscaster Digger Phelps, who played basketball at Rider from 1959 to 1963, and Jason Thompson, who played basketball at Rider from 2004 to 2008 and was drafted by the Sacramento Kings with the 12th pick of the 2008 NBA Draft while never winning a MAAC championship or appearing in the NCAA Tournament.  Prior to Thompson's years at Rider, Rider did appear in the NCAA Basketball ("March Madness") Tournament three times: first in 1984 against the University of Richmond, again in 1993 as a 16-seed losing to Kentucky 96–52, and 1994 as a 15-seed losing to Connecticut 64–49.

The university competed in football until 1951, when the football team was disbanded. A common myth is that the NCAA asked the school to discontinue the football program after an investigation into allegations of paying recruits, as well as improper benefits for players on the team. However, according to the University, Rider chose to stop sponsoring a football team for financial reasons. Rider students often proclaim their football team "undefeated since 1951".

In 2007, the University redesigned the athletic logo.

Notable alumni

 In business: Rider graduates include: Mike Pulli, CEO of Pace plc; Thomas O'Riordan, former CEO of American Sporting Goods Corporation;, Howard Stoeckel, CEO of Wawa; Kenneth Yen, CEO of China Motor Corporation; Meg Walsh, president of Medscape Consumer; and Chris Catalano, former CEO of School of Rock and past Chairman of Redbox.
 In government: Rider graduates include: Nathaniel Barnes, Liberian Ambassador to the United Nations; Craig Carpenito, former United States Attorney for the District of New Jersey; Frederick W. Donnelly, former Mayor of Trenton, New Jersey; Robert E. Grossman and Mark S. Schweiker, MA, 44th Governor of Pennsylvania.
 In sports: Rider graduates include: Florian Valot, professional soccer player for FC Cincinnati; Jack Armstrong, 1990 Major League Baseball all-star and world champion; Al Downing, 1967 MLB All-Star and strikeout champion and 1971 MLB Comeback Player of the Year; Stella Johnson, professional basketball player in WNBA and all-time leading Bronc scorer; Jeff Kunkel, professional baseball player; Caroline Lind, MBA, Olympic Gold Medal rower at the 2008 Summer Olympics in Beijing; Digger Phelps, ESPN college basketball analyst and former Notre Dame Fighting Irish basketball coach; Bobby Smith, National Soccer Hall of Fame member; and Jason Thompson, basketball player in the NBA. 
 In entertainment: Rider graduates include Joanne Nosuchinsky, actress and Fox News Channel contributor.

References

External links
 
 Rider Athletics website

 
1865 establishments in New Jersey
Educational institutions established in 1865
Lawrence Township, Mercer County, New Jersey
Private universities and colleges in New Jersey
Universities and colleges in Mercer County, New Jersey